Eugenia Burzio (20 June 1882 – 16 May 1922) was an Italian operatic dramatic soprano known for her vibrant voice and passionate style of singing. She was particularly prominent in the verismo repertoire, creating the role of Delia Terzaghi in Ruggero Leoncavallo's Goffredo Mameli as well as singing Minnie in the Italian premiere of Giacomo Puccini's La fanciulla del West but was also admired in Verdi and other 19th century repertoire. While many music critics found her interpretations imaginative and exciting, others criticized her for the unevenness of her voice and other technical shortcomings.

Career
Burzio was born in Poirino, Piedmont.  Initially, she pursued a career as a violinist but decided instead to concentrate on opera singing whilst a teenager, stating she was born in 1879 in order to study voice at the Milan Conservatory with Carolina Ferni who herself had studied with Giuditta Pasta. She made her professional début as Santuzza, in Pietro Mascagni's Cavalleria rusticana, at the Teatro Vittorio Emmanuel, Turin in 1899.

She went on to enjoy a highly successful career throughout her homeland as a lyric-dramatic soprano, although her ardent, larger-than-life mode of vocalism was not calculated to appeal to the taste of more conservative British and American audiences and she never sang at  Covent Garden or the Metropolitan Opera. This has limited the scope of her international reputation. However she had huge successes in South America, Egypt and Russia—at St Petersburg's Aquarium Theatre.

Burzio was a magnetic actress and she became particularly associated with the music of the verismo school of composers, exemplified by Mascagni, Catalani, Leoncavallo, Umberto Giordano and, to a certain extent, Puccini. She was a star performer with a fanatical following at Italy's pre-eminent opera house, La Scala, Milan, during the first two decades of the 20th century. There Burzio appeared in a wide repertoire, often under the baton of Toscanini, her roles including Gluck’s Armide, Bellini’s Norma, Alfano's Risurrezione, Franchetti's La Figlio di Jorio, Pacini's Saffo, Catalani's La Wally and Loreley, Aida, La Gioconda, and Cavalleria Rusticana.

In addition, Burzio cut a number of frequently gripping 78-rpm gramophone recordings in Milan between 1905 and 1916. Towards the end of her career, however, she suffered from a nervous disorder and general ill-health. She made her final stage appearance in 1919, in Ponchielli’s Marion Delorme. Burzio died at Milan, three years later, aged 40, of kidney failure. She is buried in the family tomb in Chieri, Piedmont.

In a newspaper interview Burzio stated "A verismo role is bound to produce a melodramatic performance and artificial elation, and it's artificial because it isn't always a musical approach and when you are young, you don't know the correct approach. This can lead to strain on the nervous system. Nervous exhaustion is more damaging to the voice than the difficulty or length of the role". (The Levik memoirs, page 117)

Recordings on CD
Eugenia Burzio: Verismo Soprano Complete Recorded Operatic Repertoire (Fonotipia, Milano, 1905–1910; Columbia, Pathé and Phonodisc Mondial, Milano, 1912–1916) Label: Marston Records 52020.
"Eugenia Burzio:The great dramatic soprano". Renowned producer Keith Hardwick's selection of arias and speeds. Pearl Gemm 9269.
"The Harold Wayne Collection, Volume 37, Eugenia Burzio, Emma Carelli, Ester Mazzoleni", Symposium 1244.
"Eugenia Burzio": Legendary voices Preiser PR89723. 2009
"Eugenia Burzio": 2-CD set Club 99 CL587/88.

References
H.F.V.L Review of 'Me pellegrina' and 'Madre pietosa Vergine' Gramophone Magazine June 1939
Hurst, P.G. "The Golden Age Recorded" Gibbs and Damworth. 1946. 
Celletti, Rodolfo Le grandi voci: Istituto per la collaborazione culturale, 1964
Steane, John "The Grand Tradition: Seventy Years of Singing on Record", Scribner (New York, NY), 1974
Gara, Eugene "La Scala" Electa Milano 1975.
Scott, Michael, The Record of Singing, published by Duckworth, London, in two volumes, 1977/79.
Lebow, Ellen A, Liner notes for Club 99 2-LP set 'Eugenia Burzio' CL 87/88.
Various authors, "Eugenia Burzio, tra romaticismo e verismo" Chieri and Poirino 1982.
Rasponi, Lanfranco "The last of the Prima Donnas" Ester Mazzoleni interview.Victor Gollanz, 1984.
Evans, Allan Liner notes for Club 99-CD set.
Celletti, Rodolfo,"Grandi voci alla Scala". Teatro La Scala.1991.
Steane, John Review of Club 99-CD set Gramophone Magazine January 1991: Page 86
Various authors, "Eugenia Burzio Un secolo dopo l'esordio (1899–1999), Comune di Poirino, Citta di Chieri,1999.
Ashbrook, William (1999) Liner Notes, Eugenia Burzio: Verismo Soprano, Marston Records 52020.
Bruder, Harold "Review of Eugenia Burzio, Marston." Opera Quarterly. Summer2000, Vol. 16 Issue 3, p491 
Green, London "Waxing Poetic". Opera Quarterly; Autumn2000, Vol. 16 Issue 4, p571.
Rideout, Bob "Eugenia Burzio", 'The Record Collector' Volume 46 no.3 September 2001.
Aspinall, Michael "The Burzio records" 'The Record Collector' As above.
Banuelas, Roberto "Eugenia Burzio" El Buho Num 22 Sept 2001 Mexico.
Williams, John and "Eugenia Burzio" liner notes for Pearl CD.
"Artisti poirinese del passato", chapter "Eugenia Burzio, una voce da scoprire" Comune di Poirino.2005.
Steane, J.B.: "Eugenia Burzio", Grove Music Online ed. L. Macy (Accessed October 18, 2008), (subscription access) 
Levik, Sergei "The Levik memoirs" Translated by Edward Morgan, Symposium Records. With quotes from Burzio.
Liff, Vivian "Burzio, Mazzoleni, Carelli" American Record Guide; Mar/Apr2010, Vol. 73 Issue 2, p249
Tosco, Angelo "Vissi d 'arte me pellegrini – Trionfi e amori di Eugenia Burzio" Gaidano & Matta. Chieri,2012. with many rare photographs and documents from the recently revealed 'Burzio archive'.

External links
Biography
Eugenia Burzio Facebook page with many photographs and articles (https://www.facebook.com/#!/pages/Eugenia-Burzio/228959903950)

Audio files
Eugenia Burzio –  from Boito's Mefistofele (recorded 1910)
Eugenia Burzio –  from Mascagni's Cavalleria rusticana (recorded 1908)

1882 births
1922 deaths
People from Poirino
Italian operatic sopranos
Fonotipia Records artists
Deaths from kidney failure
Milan Conservatory alumni
19th-century Italian women opera singers
20th-century Italian women opera singers